Gina Coello (born 2 October 1962) is a Honduran long-distance runner. She competed in the women's marathon at the 2000 Summer Olympics.

References

1962 births
Living people
Athletes (track and field) at the 2000 Summer Olympics
Honduran female long-distance runners
Honduran female marathon runners
Olympic athletes of Honduras
Pan American Games competitors for Honduras
Athletes (track and field) at the 1987 Pan American Games
Athletes (track and field) at the 1999 Pan American Games
World Athletics Championships athletes for Honduras
Place of birth missing (living people)
Central American Games gold medalists for Honduras
Central American Games medalists in athletics